Sahlingia xandaros is a species of sea snail, a marine gastropod mollusk in the clade Vetigastropoda.

References

External links
 To Biodiversity Heritage Library (1 publication)
 To Encyclopedia of Life
 To World Register of Marine Species

Vetigastropoda
Gastropods described in 2001